Martin Sertich (born October 13, 1982) is an American former professional ice hockey center who played in the American Hockey League (AHL) with the Iowa Stars and Lake Erie Monsters.

Playing career
Sertich attended Colorado College for four years, winning the Hobey Baker Award as a junior in 2005 after leading the nation in points (64). Sertich also had an impressive season in his senior year as captain, being honored as a finalist for the Hobey Baker. Over his four years with Colorado College, Sertich dressed for every game.

Much in the same vein as fellow Hobey Baker winner and former teammate Junior Lessard, Sertich signed a two-year contract with the Dallas Stars as a free agent following his collegiate play on July 10, 2006.

On June 10, 2008, Sertich was traded from the Dallas Stars to the Colorado Avalanche in exchange for a conditional draft pick in 2009 NHL Entry Draft. Sertich was later signed to a multi-year contract with the Avalanche on June 24, 2008. Marty was assigned to AHL affiliate, the Lake Erie Monsters, for the 2008–09 season but had his season limited to only 24 games as he suffered two separate concussions.

In the 2009–10 season, Sertich returned and improved his season totals to 28 points in 53 games before he was again struck down with a concussion against the Milwaukee Admirals on February 10, 2010, ruling him out for the remainder of the season.

On April 17, 2010, Sertich signed as a free agent to a one-year contract with Swiss team, EHC Olten of the second tier National Liga B.

In each of his three seasons with Olten, Sertich led the team in points and was amongst the league's top scorers. On July 21, 2013, Sertich left Switzerland as a free agent and signed a one-year contract with German club, Iserlohn Roosters of the Deutsche Eishockey Liga.

Following his Iserlohn stint, Sertich stayed in the German league, signing a two-year deal with the Hamburg Freezers in April 2014.

Career statistics

Awards and honors

References

External links
 

1982 births
Living people
Colorado College Tigers men's ice hockey players
EHC Olten players
Hamburg Freezers players
HC Lugano players
Iowa Stars players
Iserlohn Roosters players
Lake Erie Monsters players
Sportspeople from Colorado Springs, Colorado
People from Roseville, Minnesota
Sioux Falls Stampede players
Ice hockey players from Minnesota
Hobey Baker Award winners
American men's ice hockey centers
Roseville Area High School alumni
AHCA Division I men's ice hockey All-Americans